Korea National Open University (KNOU) is a national university of South Korea. The school provides higher education including undergraduate, graduate and non-degree programs as well as distance-learning courses in Korean for more than 180,000 students. It was established in 1972 as a branch faculty of Seoul National University, with 2-year junior college courses. In 1982, KNOU was separated from SNU and established as a national university, launching programs for 4-year undergraduate degrees. As of 2009, the university has 46 offices and regional learning centres nationwide, and domestic cable television channel (OUN) for broadcasting lectures. It provides accredited bachelor's and master's degree for various fields, as well as non-degree qualifications such as diplomas and certificates, or life-long learning units. The school's main campus is located in Daehak-ro, Jongro-gu, Seoul.

With more than 180,000 students enrolled, including 700 postgraduate students, KNOU is the first distance and lifelong educational institution of South Korea, and the largest educational institution in the country by enrollment. Since its foundation, more than 500,000 students have been enrolled, and 350,000 students graduated from the university.

History
KNOU was founded in 1972 as a branch of Seoul National University. It began by offering a two-year junior college program to 12,000 students and now has over 200,000 full-time, degree-seeking students for four-year university programs and some part-time students for non-degree, lifelong education programs. It also offers online graduate programs for several major areas.

Education
The university includes four colleges:
College of Liberal Arts
College of Social Science
College of Natural Science
College of Education

It also includes seventeen graduate schools:
Department of Practical English
Department of Practical Chinese
Department of Japanese Language & Culture
Department of French Language & Culture
Department of Law
Department of Public Administration
Department of Management
Department of Media Arts & Culture Contents
Department of Agriculture and Life Science
Department of Economics
Department of Computer Science
Department of e-Learning
Department of Bioinformatics
Department of Envitonmental Health Systems
Department of Nursing
Department of Lifelong Education
Department of Youth Education
Department of Early Childhood Education

Campus
The university has campuses in every major city of South Korea. Cities which have KNOU campuses include: Seoul, Daejeon-Chungnam, Busan, Daegu-Gyeongbuk, Incheon, Gwangju-Jeonnam, Gyeonggi, Gangwon, Jeonbuk, Chungbuk, Gyeongnam, Ulsan, Jeju.

Notable alumni
Kim, Hyo-joon, CEO of BMW Korea
Lee, Kyung-jun, Former CEO of KT Corporation
Kwon, Young-soo, Vice Chairman of LG Group, Former CEO of LG Display
Lee, Chul, Former CEO of Korail
Kim, Il-joong, CEO of Pantech Korea
Kim, Jun-il, CEO of Lock & Lock
Choi, Yoon-cheol, CEO of Dong Il Architects & Engineers
Lee, Pan-jung, CEO of NetPia
Park, In-ju, CEO of Zeniel
Lee, Jae-myung, Governor of Gyeonggi-do province
Song, Yong-gil, Mayor of Incheon city
Seol, Dong-geun, Vice Minister of the Ministry of Education, Science and Technology
Kim, Choong-hwan, Member of National Assembly(Senator)
Lee, Jin-bok, Member of National Assembly(Senator)
Chung, Doo-eon, Member of National Assembly(Senator)
Kim, Choon-jin, Member of National Assembly(Senator)
Oh, Jong-nam, Professor at Seoul National University
Kang In-soo, singer
Kim Kwang-kyu, actor
Kim Mi-sook, actress

See also
List of national universities in South Korea
List of universities and colleges in South Korea
Education in Korea

References

External links 
 Official school website

Open University
Open University
Educational institutions established in 1972
1972 establishments in South Korea